Syed I Ahson is a computer science professor, education management professional, researcher, and author. He specialises in multiple areas, including bioinformatics, computational biology, and Web 2.0. 

Ahson graduated from University of Sheffield in the United Kingdom. He was a National Merit Scholarship Award, India (1959–1965). He also won a British Council Overseas Scholarship Award for Ph.D. (1973–1975). He later taught in Saudi Arabia and India. His recent posting was at Patna University, Bihar as pro-Vice chancellor. While there he enacted educational reforms amide political chaos and bureaucracy.

In 2010, he stepped down from the post of pro-Vice chancellor of Patna University.

He has published several research papers in national as well as international journal and conference proceedings. Ahson is also the founder Head of the Department of Computer Science at Jamia Millia University.

Work
Professor of Eminence, Shobhit University, Uttar Pradesh, India (2011-2012)
Pro-Vice-Chancellor of Patna University, Bihar, India
Professor of Computer Science, Jamia Millia Islamia, New Delhi, India (2001–2007)
Professor, King Saud University, Riyadh, Saudi Arabia (1993–2000)
Professor, Indian Institute of Technology, Delhi, India (1991–1992)
Chairman and Professor, Computer Engineering Department, King Saud University, Riyadh, Saudi Arabia (1988–1990)
Assistant Professor and Professor, Indian Institute of Technology, Delhi, India (1978–1987)
Lecturer, Patna University, Bihar, India

Books
R. A. Khan, K. Mustafa and S. I. Ahson, "Software Quality Concepts and Practices", Narosa Publications, 2006 Alpha Science/Oxford 2007.
S. I. Ahson, “Microprocessors”, Tata McGraw-Hill, 1986.
D.P.Kothari, A. K. Mahalanabis and S. I. Ahson, "Computer-Aided System Analysis and Design", Tata McGraw-Hill, 1988.
S. I. Ahson (Editor-in-Chief), "Recent Advances in Servomechanisms Design and Realization in India", Indian Space Research Organization (ISRO), Bangalore, 1984.
S. I. Ahson and R.Prasad, "Swachalit Niyantran Nikayon ke Siddhant",(Hindi),Madhya Pradesh Hindi Granth Academy,Bhopal,1980
S. I. Ahson and S.M.Bhaskar, "Information Security-A Practical Approach", -Narosa Publications – 2008,Alpha Science/Oxford
S. I. Ahson and Monica Mehrotra (Editors), "Proceedings of National Workshop on Software Security(NWSS-2007)", 13-14 Sept. 2007,I.K.International Publishing House Pvt Lmtd.,New Delhi

References

Living people
Academic staff of Patna University
Academic staff of King Saud University
Year of birth missing (living people)
Alumni of the University of Sheffield
Computer science educators